Achille Fontanelli (8 November 1775 – 22 July 1838) was an Italian nationalist and Napoleonic general. Born into a low-ranking noble family, he took service with a pro-French Italian military unit in 1797. He was captured in 1799 but was repatriated in time to serve in the Marengo Campaign in 1800. He was promoted to general officer in 1804 and in the 1809 war he led an Italian division in several major battles. After serving as Minister of War to Eugène de Beauharnais, he was tapped to command a division in the 1813 campaign. After the collapse of Napoleon's empire in 1814, he took service with the Austrian Empire.

Biography
Fontanelli was born in Modena on 8 November 1775 to a minor Italian aristocratic family, son of Marquis Alfonso and Paolina Cervi. His parents died while he was young. With the arrival in Italy of Napoleon Bonaparte's French army in 1796 he enrolled in the city Guard of Modena.

Early military career
The following year he transferred to one of the Bologna Cohorts of the Lombard Legion, which became part of Jean Lannes' brigade. In February he served against Michelangelo Alessandro Colli-Marchi's forces in Romagna, and was at the capture of Ancona. In mid June Bonaparte ordered an expedition against the Ionian Islands. The Lombard Legion had been split in two parts with the Transpadane Cohorts gathered under the name of the 3rd Legion. Taking temporary command of this unit Fontanelli led it in the capture of Corfu. In 1798 his command returned to central Italy and joined Giuseppe Lechi for a joint march against Rome, however the Pope resigned before the invasion so the Legion remained in garrison at Pesaro.

War of the Second Coalition 1799–1800
In 1799, the Lombard Legion evolved into the 3rd Cisalpine Demi-Brigade. After the renewed outbreak of hostilities Fontanelli marched towards Ferrara and Verona under Joseph Hélie Désiré Perruquet de Montrichard, serving at the action at Finale and retreating to Bologna, then to Pesaro, where, together with Domenico Pino, he refused to participate in General Lahoz's decision to capitulate. Fontanelli instead marched the Legion to Ancona, which was under blockade from a joint Turkish-Russian fleet led by admirals Wejnowich and Pastokhin. The Fontanelli column was welcome in the Citadel, but Fontanelli was arrested on suspicion of insubordination. The Cisalpine officers were however totally discharged, and attached to the Ancona garrison.

Following the eventual surrender of Ancona at the end of 1799 Fontanelli was repatriated to France, where in 1800 he was reassigned to command a light infantry battalion of the Legione Italica. At the head of this he followed Bonaparte in the crossing of the Alps and the Marengo Campaign.

Napoleonic Wars
In 1802 he served as an aide-de-camp to Napoleon. In 1804 he was named General de Brigade, Count of the Empire, and Commander of the Légion d'Honneur. On 1 August 1805 Fontanelli was appointed commander of the Corps of Gardes Velites in the Italian Royal Guard under Pino, holding this post until 1811. In 1805–1806 he commanded the Italian division in Italy.

Promoted General de Division in 1809, he took command of the 2nd, later 1st Italian Division in the Army of Italy under Eugène de Beauharnais. Initially serving in the Tyrol campaign in April, his corps returned to Italy to fight at the Battle of Piave on 8 May 1809. He also led his troops at the Battle of Tarvis on 17 May and Battle of Raab on 14 June. After the Battle of Wagram he was honoured as Count of the Empire, Grand Officer of the Legion d'Honneur and major general in 1810. Appointed aide-de-camp to the king and commander of the 1st Military Division at Milan, he was appointed Minister of the War and Navy of the Kingdom of Italy from 1811 to 1814.

From 1813 he was charged with the reorganization of the Italian troops into five divisions. In autumn 1813 he was given command of the 15th Division composed of four regiments and a divisional battery (brigades of Sant'Andrea and Moroni) of Italians in IV Corps under Henri Gatien Bertrand, replacing Luigi Gaspare Peyri, and saw action at the battles of Grossbeeren on 23 August, Dennewitz 6 September, Wartenburg on 3 October and Leipzig on 16–19 October. After Leipzig, Fontanelli's division successfully held Lindenau, allowing the remains of Napoleon's La Grande Armée to reach France.

Late life

After the Restoration he was given the rank of Austrian Feldmarschall-Leutnant, with which he retired to private life and died of bone cancer in autumn 1838 in Milan. The head of his funeral procession was led by the Austrian field marshal Joseph Radetzky von Radetz.

Awards and decorations

References

Further reading
 

18th-century Italian people
Italian generals
Italian military personnel of the Napoleonic Wars
Italian commanders of the Napoleonic Wars
Italian military personnel in Austrian armies
1775 births
1838 deaths